Chris Waegner is an American visual effects artist. He was nominated for an Academy Award in the category Best Visual Effects for the film Spider-Man: No Way Home.

Selected filmography 
 Spider-Man: No Way Home (2021; co-nominated with Kelly Port, Scott Edelstein and Dan Sudick)

References

External links 

Living people
Place of birth missing (living people)
Year of birth missing (living people)
Visual effects artists
Visual effects supervisors